Skrapan is the commonly used name for the only skyscraper building in Västerås, Sweden. The building is 81 meters tall and was constructed from 1988 to 1990. At the top of the building is a bar called Skybar with a good view of lake Mälaren.

After the construction in 1990, it was the third tallest building in Sweden. 

Currently, it is the fourteenth tallest building in the country.

References 

Skyscrapers in Sweden
Buildings and structures in Västerås
Buildings and structures completed in 1990
1990 establishments in Sweden